Ischnocampa angulosa is a moth of the family Erebidae. It was described by Max Gaede in 1928. It is found in Brazil.

References

 

Ischnocampa
Moths described in 1928